Brad Morkos (born 27 February 2003) is a Lebanon international rugby league footballer who plays as a  for the Canberra Raiders in the NRL.

Playing career

Early career
Morkos played his junior football for the Illawarra Steelers and was selected for the Australian Schoolboys before being signed by the Canberra Raiders on a three-year NRL deal in 2021.

2022
Morkos played for the NSW U19s in June playing in the centres in a 32-4 win for the NSW U19s.

Morkos made his international debut for Lebanon in their 34-12 loss to New Zealand at the 2021 Rugby League World Cup in October.

References

External links
Canberra Raiders profile
Lebanon profile

2003 births
Living people
Australian rugby league players
Lebanon national rugby league team players
Rugby league centres